Sawston United Football Club is a football club based in Sawston, England. The club is affiliated to the Cambridgeshire County Football Association.

History
The club was formed in  1946. The club entered the FA Cup in 1948, losing 2–8 to Parson Drove in the preliminary round.

The team has played in local leagues, playing in the Peterborough Football league in the 1950s. The club then moved at some time to the Cambridgeshire County Football League, winning the league on several occasions.

The end of the 2017–18 season saw the club finish second bottom of the Premier Division, but instead of being relegated to the division below, the club was relegated 4 divisions to Division 2a. The team finished as runners-up of Division 2a a season later and gained promotion to Division 1a.

Ground

The club play their home games at Spicers Sports Ground.

Honours
Cambridgeshire County Football League
Premier Division champions (3) 2001–02, 2002–03, 2005–06 
Senior B champions(1) 2008–09
Senior A champions(1) 2008–09
Division One A champions(2) 1995–96, 2007–08
Kershaw Premier League Cup (1) 2001–02

Cliff Bullen Saturday Challenge Cup
Winners (3) 1998–99, 2001–02, 2006–07

Foster Challenge Cup
Winners (1) 2011–12

William Cockell Memorial Cup
Winners (1) 2011–12

References

External links
Official website

Football clubs in England
Cambridgeshire County Football League
Association football clubs established in 1946
1946 establishments in England
United F.C.